Daewon Kim (born 24 April 1992) is a former professional South Korean football midfielder, who last played for FK Pardubice in the Czech National Football League.

References

External links 
 
 Daewon Kim FK Pardubice player profile

South Korean footballers
1992 births
Living people

Association football midfielders
FK Pardubice players